Polyane is a French trademark registered in 1965. Polyane is a range of insulating and waterproof plastic films. It is used by building and public works professionals. It is a term often misused as a generic noun for plastic film.

History

Piat, pioneer of the profession  (1954-1964) 
Henri Piat, a mechanical enthusiast, finds that his bicycle's brake cables are poorly protected. The question then arises of covering them with polyvinyl chloride (PVC). But to get the necessary compound, the problem was to find a company that used it. That's what Établissements B. do, they inject it to make bicycle handlebars. But Établissements B. don't want to sell him their compound. Then, he bought it thanks to a third person the handlebars sleeves to crush them and thus recover the compound which he needs. To protect his brakes, Henri Piat had to develop and build an extruder.

The two PVC manufacturers of the time – Rhône-Poulenc and Saint-Gobain – appreciated this dynamism and Piat began to think that covering brake cables and electrical wires were not two such different activities. Then, he built an extruder with a square head to solve this problem. This one even competes with the Câbles de Lyon and its business works so well that offers are presented to him. Then he ended up selling.

At the beginning of 1954, during the Marist alumni dinner, Piat met up again with J.-E. Mazuyer who had also launched himself into plastics with the creation of his company, the Société Plastique Soudé. He buys sheaths to Plymouth, Laroche and La Cellophane, then transforms them into sachets.

The two colleagues decide to create together the Company of Transformation of Synthesis Products, more famous under the name of Prosyn. With a capital of fifty thousand old francs and located rue des Forges in Saint-Étienne, Piat holds 60% of the shares, Mazuyer owns 40%.

For eight years, the company grew considerably. It was in 1954, during a trip to Atlantic City, the packaging capital, on the occasion of the Packaging Show, when Piat came up with an idea about the equipment to be used to launch Prosyn, and he turned to the Italian L. Bandera to buy him an extruder of the same name, machine three times cheaper than the one proposed by the Americans, and half cheaper than that of the Germans. To acquire it, he commits almost all of Prosyn's capital and must obtain an import licence.

Prosyn's early difficulties were technical, but this was one of the characteristics of French industries during the 1950s. In addition, there were three main competitors on the market: La Cellophane, Plymouth and Laroche Frères.

But Prosyn is already on the move and continues to develop. Its production is more important, more diversified, so it is necessary to buy new machines, enlarge the premises, employ new workers, etc. The company moves a first time towards the station Châteaucreux in Saint-Etienne.

Piat and Mazuyer have started a great business but they are both very pragmatic, if two or three of their ten customers stopped placing orders, the company could not last. So, they weren't closed to a sale.

The SNPA, the arrival of a giant (1964-1999) 
Since the early 1950s, the Société Nationale des Pétroles d'Aquitaine, part of the Rhône-Alpes CRRA Research Centre, has been interested in polymers by creating a specialised service.

In 1964, they jointly and equally acquired a stake in Prosyn with Lafarge. Both had an interest in buying Prosyn; Lafarge to increase the waterproofing of its cement bags, the SNPA to be able to develop and promote the use of polyethylene films. Under this impulse, the company is moved to Saint-Chamond on a site of more than 27 000 m2. The company's production rose from 600 tonnes in 1957 to 15,500 tonnes in 1970.

Subsequently, the SNPA took over the entire capital of Prosyn and in the 1980s, the Société Nationale des Pétroles d'Aquitaine became the Elf Atochem group.

Prosyn then becomes Prosyn Polyane and the group launches an unprecedented marketing strategy around the use of plastic films. In the momentum of this exponential growth, the Polyane brand was born in 1965. Over the years, the brand expanded to include a complete range of polyethylene films adapted to different uses, with more advanced technology and technicality.

Elf Atochem has created many new plastic applications and, to meet the growing needs, the group has invented many new businesses.

The company reached its peak in the 1980s, when it employed over 800 people. Characterized as a development unit, it designs several products:

 stretch film;
 garbage bag;
 printing on plastic film; 
 agricultural film;
 technical film;
 building film.

In the 1990s, notably the printings on plastic films in 1995 and rubbish bags in 1999.

Verdoso, the Luxembourgian industrial group enters France (1999-2001) 
In 1999, the company employs only 150 employees and it meets great difficulties of profitability; Elf Atochem always seeks to sell it for several years. In 1998, it generated a turnover of FRF 230 million (EUR 35.06 million) and nevertheless generated a negative result. Its annual production was 26,000 tonnes.

Elf Atochem then sold the latter to the Luxembourgian industrial group Verdoso in 1999. The latter holds 55% of the capital of Société de Production de Films Plastiques (SPFP), which has taken over Prosyn Polyane, and the remaining 45% belong to a French industrialist: Jacques Valette, who will be appointed new CEO of the acquired entity. This is the first industrial site in France for Verdoso, which already controls the British adhesive tape manufacturer Sellotape. His main objective is to develop at Prosyn Polyane the manufacture of film for industry and agriculture.

With this sale, Elf Atochem signs its withdrawal from the polyethylene transformation sector, a sector in which it was no longer in a strong position. Six months earlier, he had already sold Alplast, of Sainte-Marie-aux-Mines (Haut-Rhin), which manufactured plastic bags for mass distribution, to Natexis Investissement.

ADELPRO, the intervention of an agricultural specialist (2001-2004) 
The company was bought again in October 2001 by the Adelpro group, a specialist in agricultural film, giving birth to a French number one,. Adelpro is a holding  company comprising three polyethylene processing units with a capital of 5.2 million euros.

The three companies constituting this holding company are: Addem Plastiques (Firminy, Loire), the former agricultural division of the British group Autobar Flexible France, which was then called Deltalène (Sainte Sigolène, Haute-Loire) and Prosyn Polyane (Saint-Chamond, Loire).

Two former Autobar executives controlled this group and they were keen to develop it on the French agricultural and horticultural market, for greenhouses, silage, mulching and plasticulture in general.

The group then had a volume of 43,000 tonnes, a turnover of 55 million euros and employed 210 people.

Each processing unit will remain legally and commercially independent, which will generate greater purchasing power from the holding company, since it is a business where the raw material weighs heavily in the final cost of production.

The joint export development of products for livestock farming and market gardening will also give the group a European dimension by remaining the market leader and developing highly technical products.

In July 2003, the group acquired Ribeyron (Sainte Sigolène, Haute-Loire),. At this moment, ADELPRO represents a production volume of 66,000 tons, a turnover of 94 million euros and employs 296 people. It became the French leader and one of the main players in the design and manufacture of agricultural films. Its activity can be divided into four categories:

 agricultural films 50%;
 technical films 20%;
 20% bagging;
 building films 10%.

Prosyn Polyane expects a turnover of 70 million euros when it is bought in 2001 and the company changes its name and becomes Polyane.

Prolene, a springboard to business resumption (2004-2006) 
Adelpro having been in receivership since November 2003, the commercial court of Saint-Étienne decided to stop the group's activities. The garbage bags, technical films and checkout bags business had already been sold to Ribeyron SAS in May.

In order not to completely cease the group's activity, the court agreed to keep Deltalène and Polyane together, and the new company will be called Prolène and will be managed by Jacques Valette, former CEO of the entity owned by the Verdoso group.

Jacques Valette then undertakes to repay all his debts over eight years and his production estimates amount to forty million euros.

Despite these forecasts, the company remained under observation by a judicial agent and was ordered to wait for the court's agreement for each of its purchases.

As the company could not honour its debts, it found itself on the verge of bankruptcy. It is then that several proposals of repurchase are made by great professionals on the plastic market: Plastika Kritis, Hyplast and Ginegar. The latter two understand that they will not stand alone against the Greek group. They then choose to join forces to face the latter, but the court makes its decision and opts for the proposal of repurchase by Plastika Kritis.

Plastika Kritis, number two in the world (2006-today) 
Plastika Kritis is one of Europe's leading producers of masterbatches and agricultural films. It has an international orientation with affiliated companies in France, Romania, Poland, Russia, Turkey and China and exports to over sixty countries. It has been listed on the Athens Stock Exchange since 1999.

In 2006, Plastika Kritis acquired the assets of two famous and historic French agricultural film producers, Polyane and Deltalène, and combined them into a new company, Agripolyane.

Today, Agripolyane, the company behind this brand, has become the French leader and one of the main world players in the design and manufacture of greenhouse cover films. It is also one of the few companies in this field to develop its own additives. In addition, the company has an innovative machinery park on an industrial site of more than 27,000 m2, some of which are the largest in the world, and a market extending over more than sixty countries.

The Polyane brand is now recognized in its sector as the leading brand of building films. Victim of its success, the term Polyane is often used as a generic term to evoke plastic although this one is not an authentic Polyane. Subject to many counterfeits, the company tries to fight to keep its industrial property.

Products

Manufacturing process 
Polyane films are manufactured using the extrusion-inflating principle.

Types of finished products 
Polyane plastic films are divided into several broad categories, themselves separated into numerous subcategories according to the type of plastic, its properties, the desired application, location, etc. Here is the list of the main categories that can be found:

 construction range
 protective film 
 sealing film 
 TRIDALL film 
 asbestos removal film
 agricultural range 
 greenhouse film 
 mulching film 
 semi-forcing film
 silage film 
 special film for livestock buildings
 industrial range
 shrink film
 protective cover
 packaging film

Annexes

Patents and trademarks 
The Polyane trademark was registered in 1965. Since then, the company has changed its name from Prosyn Polyane to Agripolyane. It has also diversified its activity to include agriculture, construction, industry and geomembrane. The company wanted to protect its name by registering several dozen trademarks that it has created in its main markets, both nationally and internationally, with organizations specialized in intellectual property such as the INPI (France) or the OHIM (European Union). The company has also developed new products and filed patents to protect its innovations.

References

External links 

 

Brand name materials
Polymers